The 2005 Open 13 was an ATP men's tennis tournament played on indoor hard courts in Marseille, France that was part of the 2005 ATP Tour. It was the 13th edition of the tournament and was held from February 7 to February 14. Third-seeded Joachim Johansson won the singles title.

Finals

Singles

 Joachim Johansson defeated  Ivan Ljubičić 7–5, 6–4
 It was Johansson's 2nd and last singles title of the year and the 3rd and last of his career.

Doubles

 Martin Damm /  Radek Štěpánek defeated  Mark Knowles /  Daniel Nestor 7–6(7–4), 7–6(7–5)
 It was Damm's 1st title of the year and the 30th of his career. It was Štěpánek's 1st title of the year and the 10th of his career.

References

External links
 ITF tournament edition details

Open 13
Open 13